The Academy San Francisco @ McAteer, formally known as  Academy of Arts & Sciences is a public high school located in San Francisco, California. The school is a member of the San Francisco Unified School District.

Statistics

Demographics 
2016-17

Standardized testing

Student activities

Athletics 
Fall
 Cheerleading
 Cross Country
 Girls Volleyball
Winter
 Boys Basketball
 Girls Basketball
 Boys Soccer
 Girls Soccer
Spring
 Badminton
 Baseball
 Fencing
 Girls Softball
 Track & Field
 Boys Volleyball

References 

High schools in California
High schools in San Francisco